A godmother is a female godparent in the Christian tradition; she is present at the christening of the child and promises to see that the child is raised to be a Christian. She may also offer mentorship and/or claim legal guardianship of the child as her own if needed due to circumstances.

Godmother, God Mother, or variation, may also refer to:

People

Honorary titles
Godmother, an honorary title of a pioneer in a particular field, especially in musical genres (see honorific nicknames in popular music)
Godmother, a mentor
Godmother, another name for a ship sponsor, a female civilian who "sponsors" a vessel

Individuals called "Godmother" or "The Godmother"
Celebrities
Erykah Badu, "The Godmother of Soul"
Nina Hagen, "The Godmother of Punk"
 Joan Jett, "The Godmother of Punk"
 Sharon Jones, "The Godmother of Soul"
 Patti LaBelle, "The Godmother of Soul"
 Lil' Mo, "The Godmother of Hip-Hop and R&B"
 Dolly Parton, "The Godmother of Country Music"
 Siouxsie Sioux, "Godmother of Goth"
 Patti Smith, "Godmother of Punk"
 Sister Rosetta Tharpe, "Godmother of Rock and Roll"

Criminals
Griselda Blanco, a Colombian drug lord known as "The Godmother of Cocaine"

Art, entertainment, and media

 Fiction
 Fairy godmother (disambiguation)

Films
 Godmother (film), a 1999 Hindi film
 The Godmother (film), an upcoming American biographical crime-drama film directed by Gerard Johnson, written by Frank Baldwin, and starring Catherine Zeta-Jones
 The Godmother (2011), a Romanian film starring Whitney Anderson, Dragoș Bucur, and Ștefan Iancu

Music
 God Mother, a Swedish hardcore band

Other uses
 Godmother (cocktail), a cocktail made with Italian Amaretto liqueur and vodka

See also

 List of people considered father or mother of a field
 Godfather (disambiguation)
 The Good Mother (disambiguation)
 
 
 
 Mother (disambiguation)
 God (disambiguation)